"One Man Woman" is a song written by Paul Kennerley, and recorded by American country music duo The Judds.  It was released in November 1989 as the third single from the album River of Time.  The song reached number 8 on the Billboard Hot Country Singles & Tracks chart.

Chart performance
"One Man Woman" debuted on the U.S. Billboard Hot Country Singles & Tracks for the week of November 25, 1989.

Year-end charts

References

1989 singles
The Judds songs
Songs written by Paul Kennerley
RCA Records singles
Curb Records singles
Song recordings produced by Brent Maher
1989 songs